The 2018–19 W-League season was the eleventh season of the W-League, the Australian national women's association football competition.

Clubs

Stadia and locations

Personnel and kits

Managerial changes

Transfers

Foreign players

The following do not fill a Visa position:
A Australian citizens who have chosen to represent another national team;
G Guest Players

Regular season

The regular season was played between 25 October 2018 and 6 February 2019, over 14 rounds, with each team playing twelve matches.

League table

Fixtures
Individual matches are collated at each club's season article.

Finals series

Semi-finals

Grand final

Regular-season statistics

Top scorers

Hat-tricks

Own goals

Final Series statistics

Hat-tricks

End-of-season awards
The following end of the season awards were announced at the 2018–19 Dolan Warren Awards night on 13 May 2019.
 Julie Dolan Medal – Christine Nairn (Melbourne Victory)
 NAB Young Footballer of the Year – Ellie Carpenter (Canberra United)
 Golden Boot Award – Sam Kerr (Perth Glory) (13 goals)
 Goalkeeper of the Year – Aubrey Bledsoe (Sydney FC)
 Coach of the Year – Jeff Hopkins (Melbourne Victory)
 Fair Play Award – Newcastle Jets
 Referee of the Year – Kate Jacewicz
 Goal of the Year – Cortnee Vine (Newcastle Jets v Canberra United, 17 November 2018)

See also

 W-League transfers for 2018–19 season
 2018–19 Adelaide United W-League season
 2018–19 Brisbane Roar W-League season
 2018–19 Canberra United W-League season
 2018–19 Melbourne City W-League season
 2018–19 Melbourne Victory W-League season
 2018–19 Newcastle Jets W-League season
 2018–19 Perth Glory W-League season
 2018–19 Sydney FC W-League season 
 2018–19 Western Sydney Wanderers W-League season

References

Australia
2018–19 W-League (Australia)
2018–19
2019 in women's association football